Lemyra pilosoides is a moth of the family Erebidae. It was described by Franz Daniel in 1943. It is found in the Chinese provinces of Yunnan and Sichuan.

References

 

pilosoides
Moths described in 1943